Yang Mu (born 25 January 1989) is a Chinese former footballer who is last known to have been contracted to Young Lions of the Singaporean S.League in 2009.

Young Lions

Yang signed for the Young Lions after a protracted discussion over his transfer fee, reportedly an initial $45,000 Singapore dollar, and finally transferred at a cost of $20,000.

Despite the high expectations, Yang put in a lackluster performance in his 17 appearances there, returning 4 goals.

References

External links 
 at Soccerway

Chinese footballers
Guangzhou City F.C. players
Chinese expatriates in Singapore
Association football forwards
Singapore Premier League players
Young Lions FC players
Living people
1989 births
Expatriate footballers in Singapore